The All American Open was a golf tournament on the PGA Tour in the 1940s and 1950s. It was played at the Tam O'Shanter Country Club in Niles, Illinois. It was run by George S. May and was originally known as the Tam O'Shanter National Open. From 1944 to 1946 it offered $10,000 winner's prize. The purses dropped to normal PGA Tour levels when May added the World Championship of Golf to the events played at Tam O'Shanter. May eventually added men's amateur, women's open, and women's amateur "All American" and "World Championship" events, all played at Tam O'Shanter over a two-week period in August. The tournaments were cancelled in 1958 in a dispute between May and the PGA over player entrance fees.

Winners

See also
All American Open (LPGA Tour)

References

Former PGA Tour events
Golf in Illinois
Niles, Illinois
Recurring sporting events established in 1941
Recurring sporting events disestablished in 1957
1941 establishments in Illinois
1957 disestablishments in Illinois